The Box is an Irish quiz show presented by Keith Duffy.  It was first broadcast on TV3 on 9 October 2006 and aired for one series until 27 October 2006.

The Box was described as a reality quiz show where the contestants had to live in an isolated glass box in the middle of Dublin. During the day the two contestants worked together to build up a pot of money and every night they battled against each other to see who got to keep the money.

References

2006 Irish television series debuts
2006 Irish television series endings
Irish reality television series
Irish television talk shows
Virgin Media Television (Ireland) original programming